The Crystal Mover is a rubber-tired automated people mover (APM) system for airport and light rail applications manufactured by Mitsubishi Heavy Industries in Mihara, Japan. The Crystal Mover, initially based on the Japanese APM standard, is used in automated guideway transit systems in China, Japan, Singapore, South Korea, the United Arab Emirates and the United States.

Public transport

Japan 
 Astram Line, Hiroshima
 Kanazawa Seaside Line, Yokohama
 Rokkō Island Line, Kobe
 Yurikamome, Tokyo
 Nippori-Toneri Liner, Tokyo

Singapore 
In Singapore, Crystal Movers operate on Sengkang LRT line and the Punggol LRT line, both managed by SBS Transit Ltd. These cars have been operating since 2003 on the Sengkang LRT and on the Punggol LRT since its opening in 2005. There is a fleet of 41 cars of Mitsubishi Heavy Industries Crystal Mover C810 in total for the two LRT lines. An additional order was placed for 16 more cars (Contract 810A) with identical specifications to increase capacity on both LRT lines, and had been fully delivered as of 2016.

Macau 

On 31 December 2010, Macau placed a MOP 4.688 billion order for Crystal Movers for the Macau Light Transit System, which started commercial operation on 10 December 2019. It was free of charge till 31 January 2020.

Airport connections 

Crystal Movers are currently in operation in the following airports, with most applications being in the United States:

Hong Kong 
 HKIA Automated People Mover, Hong Kong International Airport

Singapore 
 Changi Airport Skytrain, Singapore Changi Airport

South Korea 
 Incheon Airport Shuttle Train, Incheon International Airport

United Arab Emirates 
 Dubai International Airport Terminal 3 APM, Dubai International Airport, UAE

United States 
 AeroTrain, Washington Dulles International Airport, United States
 ATL Skytrain, Hartsfield-Jackson Atlanta International Airport, United States
 MIA Mover and Skytrain, Miami International Airport, United States
 Orlando International Airport People Movers, Orlando International Airport, United States
 SkyConnect, Tampa International Airport, United States

Specifications 

 Configuration: Single- or double-car
 Capacity (passengers): 105 (including 18 seats) or 210 (including 36 seats)
 Vehicle dimensions:  (length) ×  (width) ×  (height)
 Guide system: Side guide two-axis four-wheel steering system
 Electric system: Third rail at 750 volts direct current
 Gauge: ; guide rail span: 
 Maximum speed:
 Vehicle performance: 
 Operation: 
 Service acceleration and braking:  (3.6 km/h/s)
 Emergency braking:  (4.68 km/h/s)
 Car body structure: Aluminum alloy welded structure
 Traction motor: Two 3-phase alternating current induction motors each with a continuous rating of 
 Propulsion control system: IGBT–VVVF inverter vector control (individual control of each axis with variable load control)
 Brake system: Electric command pneumatic brake with regenerative brake (with stand-by brake, parking brake, variable load control and wheel slide prevention control)

See also 

 Automated guideway transit
 Rubber-tyred tram and Rubber-tyred metro
Competing systems:
 Bombardier Innovia APM 
 Véhicule Automatique Léger (VAL)

Notes

References

External links 

Light Rail Transit (Singapore) rolling stock
Airport people mover systems
Crystal Mover people movers
Crystal Mover
Electric multiple units of Hong Kong
Electric multiple units of the United States
Rolling stock of the United Arab Emirates
Multiple units of Malaysia
Electric multiple units of South Korea
Electric multiple units of Japan
Rail transport in Macau